Évelyne Trouillot (born January 2, 1954) is a Haitian author, writing in French and Creole.

Biography
Évelyne Trouillot was born in Port-au-Prince, Haiti, January 2, 1954. She was the daughter of Ernst Trouillot and Anne-Marie Morisset. After completing secondary school, she left for the United States, where she studied languages and education at the university level.

In 1987, Trouillot returned to Haiti, where she teaches French at the State University. In 2002, Évelyne, her daughter Nadève Ménard, and her brother Lyonel, founded Pré-Texte, a writer's organization that sponsors reading and writing workshops.

Her brother Lyonel is also a writer; her sister Jocelyne is a writer and academic. Her brother Michel-Rolph was an anthropologist and academic. The Haitian historian Henock Trouillot was her uncle.

Her work has been translated into German, English, Spanish, and Italian and has been published in magazines in Cuba, France, Mexico, and Canada.

Tracy Denean Sharpley-Whiting called Rosalie l’infâme "A wonderful contribution to the corpus of Francophone women writers in the Caribbean".

Awards and honours
In 2012, Trouillot received the Canute A. Brodhurst Prize for short fiction from the magazine The Caribbean Writer.

Selected works 
 La chambre interdite, short story collection (1996)
 Sans parapluie de retour, poetry (2001)
 Parlez-moi d’amour, stories (2002)
 Rosalie l’infâme, novel (2003), received the Prix de la romancière francophone awarded by the Soroptimist Club of Grenoble, published in English as The Infamous Rosalie (2013)
 L'ile De Ti Jean, children's book (2003)
 Plidetwal, poetry (2005), in Creole
 Le Bleu de l’île, play (2005), received the Prix Beaumarchais from the Ecritures Théâtrale Contemporaines en Caraïbe
 Le Mirador aux étoiles, novel (2007)
 La mémoire aux abois, novel (2010), received the Prix Carbet de la Caraïbe et du Tout-Monde, translated into English as Memory at Bay (2015)
 La fille à la guitare / Yon fi, yon gita, yon vwa, children's literature (2012), in French and Creole
 Absences sans frontières, novel (2013)
  "Par la fissure de mes mots", poetry (2014)
 Le Rond Point, novel (2015), received the Prix Barbancourt
 Je m'appelle Fridhomme, short stories, C3Editions, 2017
 Désirée Congo, novel (2020), French Edition, September 24, 2020
 Les Jumelles de la rue Nicolas, édition Project îles. (2022)

References

External links 
 "Detour" (short story) translated by Paul Curtis Daw published in Words Without Borders, Nov. 2013.
 Interview: Évelyne Trouillot by Edwidge Danticat published in BOMB, Jan. 2005.

1954 births
Living people
Haitian women poets
Haitian women dramatists and playwrights
People from Port-au-Prince
Haitian women novelists
20th-century Haitian novelists
20th-century Haitian poets
21st-century Haitian novelists
21st-century Haitian poets
21st-century Haitian dramatists and playwrights
20th-century Haitian women writers
21st-century Haitian women writers
Evelyne